Vasco Cabral (1926–2005) was a Bissau-Guinean writer and politician. 

He was minister of economy and finance and planning from 1974 to 1982. He was also minister of justice, and Second Vice President of Guinea-Bissau from 21 June 1989 to December 1991. 

Cabral was born in Farim, northern part of the country. He studied at the Technical University of Lisbon and was imprisoned in 1953 for opposing António de Oliveira Salazar's regime. He was one of the founders of PAIGC (African Party for the Independence of Guinea and Cape Verde). He published a book of poems in 1981, and was the founder and first president of national union of artists and wrtiers of Guinea Bissau. He was married to Barbara Matos. He died in Bissau.

Works
A luta é a minha primavera, 1981 (poetry)

Bibliography
 Alonso Romo, Eduardo J., Literatura africana de lengua portuguesa , Revista Espéculo n.º 40, 2008, Universidad Complutense de Madrid.

Notes

1926 births
2005 deaths
Vice presidents of Guinea-Bissau
Economy ministers of Guinea-Bissau
Finance ministers of Guinea-Bissau
Justice ministers of Guinea-Bissau
Bissau-Guinean poets
Male poets
People from Oio Region
20th-century poets
Bissau-Guinean male writers
African Party for the Independence of Guinea and Cape Verde politicians
20th-century male writers